Synaphea cervifolia is a shrub endemic to Western Australia.

It blooms between June and October producing yellow flowers.

It is found in a small area in the Wheatbelt region of Western Australia between Kulin, Dumbleyung and Lake Grace where it grows in sandy-clay-gravelly soils over laterite.

References

Eudicots of Western Australia
cervifolia
Endemic flora of Western Australia
Plants described in 1995